is a railway station located in the town of Fukaura, Aomori Prefecture Japan, operated by the East Japan Railway Company (JR East).

Lines

Station layout
Henashi  Station has one ground-level side platform serving a single bi-directional track. The station is unattended, and is managed from Goshogawara Station. The station was built with double opposed side platforms, but only  a single side platform serving bidirectional traffic is currently in use.

History
Henashi Station was opened on July 30, 1936 as a station on the Japanese Government Railways (JGR). With the privatization of the Japanese National Railways (successor of JGR) on April 1, 1987, it came under the operational control of JR East. A new station building was completed in November 2010.

Surrounding area

Sea of Japan

See also
 List of Railway Stations in Japan

References

External links

  

Stations of East Japan Railway Company
Railway stations in Aomori Prefecture
Gonō Line
Fukaura, Aomori
Railway stations in Japan opened in 1936